Top 100 Mexico is a record chart published weekly by AMPROFON (Asociación Mexicana de Productores de Fonogramas y Videogramas), a non-profit organization composed by Mexican and multinational record companies. This association tracks record sales (physical and digital) in Mexico.

In 2010, nineteen albums reached number-one. Dos Mundos: Evolución by Alejandro Fernández and Primera Fila, a live album recorded by Thalía, both reached the top spot of the chart in 2009. Dos Mundos is also the first number-one album of 2010. Amar y Querer: Homenaje a las Grandes Canciones by Kalimba, a cover album with music standards received a Gold certification in México. The album includes songs previously recorded by José José, Raphael, Emmanuel and Frank Sinatra. Who I Am, by Nick Jonas and the Administration debuted at number 3 in the Billboard 200 in the United States with first week sales of 82,000 units. The album also debuted at number 3 in the Mexican chart, reaching the top the following week. The second studio album released by Mexican band Camila, Dejarte de Amar, debuted at number-one in the Billboard Top Latin Songs chart in the United States and also on this chart. The album was awarded with a Gold certification in México on the first day of sales, with 30,000 units sold. Camila's album was replaced at number-one with the debut of the sixth studio album by Spanish singer-songwriter Bunbury titled Las consecuencias. The album also debuted at the top of the charts in Spain. Las consecuencias was awarded with a Platinum certification in Mexico.

Albums

See also
 List of number-one songs of 2010 (Mexico)

References

Number-one albums
Mexico
2010